Józef Ozimiński (6 December 1877, Warsaw – 8 July 1945, Warsaw) was a Polish violinist and conductor.

His teachers included Stanisław Barcewicz.

On 1 November 1922 in Warsaw, he was the soloist in the premiere performance of Karol Szymanowski's Violin Concerto No. 1.

References
Entry in the Encyklopedia muzyki PWN (in Polish)

1877 births
1938 deaths
Polish classical violinists
Male classical violinists
Polish conductors (music)
Male conductors (music)
Musicians from Warsaw